Allan L. Higdon is a former Ottawa City Councillor and acting mayor of Ottawa. He served on council from 1994 through 2000.

Born in Dublin, Republic of Ireland, Higdon immigrated to Canada with his family in 1957 and settled in Kingston, Ontario. He received a BA from Queen's University in English and History, a B.Ed from the University of Toronto, and also became an Associate of the Royal Conservatory of Music (ARCT).

After graduation, Higdon worked with the Canadian Institute of Mining and Metallurgy on a curriculum development project at the Ontario Institute for Studies in Education (OISE). He subsequently lived in Toronto and southeast Asia, later moving to Ottawa.  Higdon began his Ottawa career teaching at Ottawa Technical High School but quickly became involved in politics and started work on Parliament Hill in January 1982 for a Member of Parliament. Employed by the Progressive Conservative Party of Canada from January 1984, he worked in the 1984 Canadian federal election as a member of the Progressive Conservative National Campaign Committee.  Following the campaign, he served three years as Executive Assistant to a Cabinet minister.  Higdon then became a self-employed consultant specializing in social and demographic research and communications. From 1988 to 1994 he was employed as a Senior Analyst for the Department of Communications.

Active in local politics in the 1994 Ottawa municipal election, Higdon was elected to the Ottawa City Council representing the Alta Vista-Canterbury Ward. He was re-elected in the 1997 Ottawa municipal election by acclamation and appointed Deputy Mayor of Ottawa for the term 1997–2000.

After mayor Jim Watson's resignation in July 2000, Higdon was unanimously elected by Council as Acting Mayor of Ottawa until completion of his term of office in December. Higdon was defeated in the 2000 Ottawa municipal election by regional councillor Peter Hume, following the amalgamation of the city and regional government. Following his defeat, Higdon began work for the Government of Ontario - first as a member of the Social Benefits Tribunal, later the Alcohol and Gaming Commission and finally with the Licence Appeal Tribunal.

Personal life
Higdon has been active in the community in many volunteer capacities having been a member of the Board of the Riverside Hospital, the Central Canada Exhibition, the Great Canadian Theatre Company, the Confederation Centre for the Arts (Charlottetown, PEI) and a Trustee of the Ottawa Public Library, among others. He has also sung in several choirs.

Mr. Higdon is married with two grown children.

References

1947 births
Living people
Irish emigrants to Canada
Mayors of Ottawa
Ottawa city councillors
Queen's University at Kingston alumni
University of Toronto alumni
Politicians from Dublin (city)